Surrey United Soccer Club is a Canadian soccer club based in Cloverdale area in Surrey, British Columbia, Canada. The club was founded in 1968. The senior men's team goes by the name Surrey United Firefighters and plays in the Fraser Valley Soccer League.

History
The Club was formed in 1968.

Surrey United Soccer Club
Surrey United is one of the largest soccer clubs in the province of British Columbia with 2800 mini, youth, and adult players.

Currently, they have a BCSPL franchise at the highest level of youth soccer in the province and levels of play for all ages 4-adult. They are a CSA Youth Club License holder, one of the first in Canada in 2019.

Stadium
The Club plays its home matches at Cloverdale Athletic Park, which has been Surrey United's home from 1999. The team's colors are red, black and white.

Year-by-year Surrey United Firefighters Team

Honours

Surrey United
See also external links.

Sheila Anderson Memorial (Challenge) Cup
 Winners (1): 2001
J. F. Kennedy Trophy 
Winners (1):1999

Vancouver Firefighters
 Canadian Challenge Trophy:
 Winners (4): 1965, 1973, 1983, 1990
 Runners-up (1): 1961
 J.F. Kennedy Trophy:
 Winner (1): 1962

Surrey United Firefighters
 Canadian Challenge Trophy:
 Runners-up (1): 2013

Stadia
Cloverdale Athletic Park; Surrey, British Columbia (1968–present)

References

External links
 Surrey United (Official website)

Soccer clubs in British Columbia
Pacific Coast Soccer League teams
Association football clubs established in 1968
Sport in Surrey, British Columbia
Works association football teams
1968 establishments in British Columbia